The 2023 USFL Draft, also known as the 2023 USFL College Draft, was the 2nd annual meeting of United States Football League (USFL) franchises to select newly eligible players. The draft consisted of 2023 draft eligible players.

Selection order 
The selection order for subsequent rounds followed the order of the first round. The first overall pick was decided by the winner of the Week 10 game between the 1–8 Pittsburgh Maulers and 1–8 Michigan Panthers, would win the first overall pick. The Panthers were victorious 33–21.

The New Jersey Generals had their 1st round selection moved to the last pick in the draft due to "a violation of offseason roster management rules".

Player selections
The following is the breakdown of the 80 players selected by position:

 10 offensive tackles
 10 defensive ends
 8 wide receivers
 7 cornerbacks
 6 linebackers
 3 defensive tackles
 3 safeties
 3 tight ends
 2 running backs
 2 offensive guards
 2 punters
 1 kicker
 1 Long snapper

References

USFL
2023 USFL season